École Mgr-Marcel-François-Richard is a Francophone high school in Saint-Louis-de-Kent, New Brunswick, Canada operated by Francophone Sud School District.

The school is named after Monsignor Marcel-François Richard who was a priest who was especially prominent in advocating for Acadian education and rights.

References

External links
 
 

High schools in New Brunswick
1970s establishments in New Brunswick